Desulfurella amilsii is a Gram-negative, non-spore-forming, obligately anaerobic sulfur-reducing, acidotolerant, moderately thermophilic and motile bacterium from the genus of Desulfurella which has been isolated from river sediments from the Tinto River in Spain. Desulfurella amilsii phenotypic characterization is also able to utilize thiosulfate as an electron acceptor and ferment pyruvate. In addition, it uses formate as an electron donor and can have a pH as low as 3.

References

 

Campylobacterota
Bacteria described in 2016